

References

Auxiliary ships of the People's Liberation Army Navy
Auxiliary transport ship classes